Philip Richard Stant (born 13 October 1962) is an English football manager, former professional footballer and British Army soldier who served in the Falklands War and was attached to the SAS.

As a player he was a striker who after serving in the Army he entered professional football at the relatively late age of 24 but went on to score over 150 times in the Football League, most notably for Hereford United, Mansfield Town, Cardiff City and Lincoln City. He also played professionally for Reading, Notts County, Blackpool, Huddersfield Town, Fulham, Bury, Northampton Town and Brighton & Hove Albion. He spent his formative years in Non-League football for Worcester City, Dover Athletic, Hayes and Hinckley United. He initially managed Lincoln City between 2000 and 2001 whilst continuing as a player and also had similar spells in charge of Gainsborough Trinity and Ilkeston Town.

Military career
Stant joined the army as a teenager and was billeted at Aldershot Garrison for his training and played for local non-League club Camberley Town. In 1982, at the age of just 18, Stant was sent to the Falkland Islands as part of operations of the Falklands War, serving with 5 Infantry Brigade as part of 81 Ordnance Coy. He was deployed to the South Atlantic aboard the Queen Elizabeth 2, a journey that lasted three weeks and included stops in Sierra Leone and Ascension Island before arriving in the South Atlantic, landing on South Georgia.

During his time in the conflict, Stant was witness to the Bluff Cove Air Attacks, having been aboard RFA Sir Tristram earlier in the day. He had been ordered off the ship the day before to man a nearby trench in Port Pleasant. There he was witness to the Argentinian aerial attack on the two warships and was one of the first on the scene afterwards where he helped wounded soldiers. Stant has described his experiences in the aftermath as "the day I grew up" due to the injuries he witnessed. He remained on the island until July 1982, a month after the end of the hostilities there.

He progressed into the SAS and also worked as part of a bomb disposal unit before turning his attentions to football. His experiences in the South Atlantic were the subject of a 2007 ITV documentary, "Falklands 25: A soldier's story".

Playing career
A fan of home town team Bolton Wanderers, his games in The Football League came with Hereford United, although he scored twice in four games for Reading in the 1982–83 season. Bought out of the Army by Hereford for £600, Stant went on to score 38 times in 89 League appearances for the Bulls, including 28 in 1988–89, before he secured a £175,000 move to Notts County.

He played 22 times (six goals) for the Magpies and after loan spells with Blackpool, Lincoln City and Huddersfield Town he joined Fulham for £60,000 in February 1991.

Six months later he was on the move again, scoring 26 goals for Mansfield Town as the Stags won promotion from the Fourth Division, and in December 1992, was transferred £100,000 to Cardiff City.

Stant averaged a goal every other game during his three seasons at Ninian Park, including a hat-trick in the 1993 Welsh Cup final win over Rhyl, before it was Bury's turn to experience his goalscoring talents and it was from the Shakers where City purchased him for £30,000 in December 1996 where in two seasons scored 23 goals in 62 appearances.

He then moved to Lincoln City where he marked his second arrival at Sincil Bank by scoring 16 goals in 22 matches during the second half of the 1996–97 season and whilst the goals dried up the following campaign, he still played his part as the Club gained promotion on the final day of the season, assisting caretaker-manager Shane Westley in the latter half of the season.

In the Second Division campaign the following year, Stant made five substitute appearances in all competitions as he concentrated on assisting Westley and chairman John Reames, who took over as manager in November 1998. In May 2000, Reames handed the managerial reins over to Stant, who came off the bench a further 19 times in the 1999–2000 season.

Stant lasted 30 matches as Imps' boss and, four days after the Lincoln City Membership Scheme's Community Ownership Package for the shareholding of the club was successful, the new board of directors terminated the contracts of Stant and his assistant George Foster, with former Grimsby Town boss Alan Buckley coming in as his successor. A short-term playing contract at Brighton & Hove Albion followed.

Coaching career
Following his departure from Brighton, Stant joined Worcester City. He enjoyed a fruitful spell with the club, scoring a hat-trick in the 4–2 victory over Tiverton Town on 20 October 2001 and going on to notch a total of 12 goals in 23 appearances before moving on to Dover Athletic. After four appearances for Dover, Stant moved on for a brief sojourn at Hayes which saw him make three appearances in a week long stay before finishing the season at Hinckley United, linking up with one-time Notts County colleague Dean Thomas and scoring twice in seven league appearances, as well as in the Leicestershire Challenge Cup Final.

In July 2002, Stant moved back into management, being appointed player-manager at Gainsborough Trinity. Stant enjoyed a successful season at the Northolme, leading the club to the fifth round of the FA Trophy whilst securing a mid-table league finish and winning the Lincolnshire Senior County Cup, but resigned at the end of the season due to work commitments.

In October 2003, Stant returned to management with Ilkeston Town, He would steer Ilkeston to promotion to the Northern Premier League Premier Division in the 2004–05 season but a disappointing start to their campaign at the higher level saw Stant resign from his post in September 2005.

Personal life
Running the Newark & Sherwood College Football Academy whilst he's also a youth development monitor for the Football League.

Career statistics

Honours
Cardiff City
Welsh Cup: 1992–93

Individual
PFA Team of the Year: 1988–89 Fourth Division, 1991–92 Fourth Division

References

External links
Lengthy audio interview with Radio Lincolnshire, February 2006
Audio interview with Radio Lincolnshire about his Falklands memories
Ooh Ah Stantona, his autobiography published in 2006
Lincoln City Legends Profile
Speaking Profile and Video Clip

1962 births
Living people
Footballers from Bolton
English footballers
Camberley Town F.C. players
Reading F.C. players
Hereford United F.C. players
Notts County F.C. players
Blackpool F.C. players
Lincoln City F.C. players
Huddersfield Town A.F.C. players
Fulham F.C. players
Mansfield Town F.C. players
Cardiff City F.C. players
Bury F.C. players
Northampton Town F.C. players
Lincoln City F.C. managers
Brighton & Hove Albion F.C. players
Worcester City F.C. players
Hayes F.C. players
Hinckley United F.C. players
Gainsborough Trinity F.C. players
Ilkeston Town F.C. (1945) players
Gainsborough Trinity F.C. managers
Ilkeston Town F.C. managers
British Army personnel of the Falklands War
Royal Army Ordnance Corps soldiers
Special Air Service soldiers
Dover Athletic F.C. players
English Football League players
Association football forwards
English football managers
Military personnel from Lancashire